This is a list of episodes of The Mr. Peabody & Sherman Show, the American animated web television series produced by DreamWorks Animation and Jay Ward Productions. It premiered on Netflix on October 9, 2015.

Series overview

Episodes

Season 1 (2015)

Season 2 (2016)

Season 3 (2016)

Season 4 (2017)

References

Lists of American children's animated television series episodes